Chamsia Sagaf (born 1955) is a Comoros singer who sings in Shingazidja.

Life
Sagaf was born in the Comoros and she is known for singing about women and children. She first sang in women's associations in the 1970s and has created three albums. She has lived in France since 1975. She is married and has five children.

In 2003, she was nominated for the trophy for best singer in East Africa.

References

1955 births
Living people
Comorian women singers
21st-century Comorian singers
20th-century Comorian singers
21st-century women singers
20th-century women singers